The UK Singles Chart is one of many music charts compiled by the Official Charts Company that calculates the best-selling singles of the week in the United Kingdom. Before 2004, the chart was only based on the sales of physical singles. This list shows singles that peaked in the Top 10 of the UK Singles Chart during 1969, as well as singles which peaked in 1968 and 1970 but were in the top 10 in 1969. The entry date is when the single appeared in the top 10 for the first time (week ending, as published by the Official Charts Company, which is six days after the chart is announced).

One-hundred and fifteen singles were in the top ten in 1969. Eight singles from 1968 remained in the top 10 for several weeks at the beginning of the year while "All I Have to Do Is Dream" by Bobbie Gentry and Glen Campbell, "Melting Pot" by Blue Mink, "Suspicious Minds" by Elvis Presley and "Tracy" by The Cuff Links were all released in 1969 but did not reach their peak until 1970. "Albatross" by Fleetwood Mac and "Ob-La-Di, Ob-La-Da" by Marmalade were the singles from 1968 to reach their peak in 1969. Thirty artists scored multiple entries in the top 10 in 1969. David Bowie, Glen Campbell, Jethro Tull, Johnny Cash and Marvin Gaye were among the many artists who achieved their first UK charting top 10 single in 1969.

The 1968 Christmas number-one, "Lily the Pink" by The Scaffold, remained in the top 10 for the first weeks of 1969. The first new number-one single of the year was "Ob-La-Di, Ob-La-Da" by Marmalade. Overall, eighteen different singles peaked at number-one in 1969, with The Beatles (2) having the joint most singles hit that position.

Background

Controversial French-language song reaches number-one
1969 saw a foreign-language song reach number-one in the UK Singles Chart for the first time in the chart's history; "Je t'aime... moi non plus" by Jane Birkin and Serge Gainsbourg. The controversial French-language song was banned in several countries due to its overtly sexual content. "Je t'aime..." was originally released in the UK by Fontana Records and the Fontana release entered the UK top 10 at number eight on 31 August 1969 (6 September 1969, week ending). However, after it had reached number two, Fontana deleted the single, allegedly because the wife of Fontana's boss was appalled at her husband's company releasing such a song. After this, "Je t'aime..." was picked up by Major Minor Records, who acquired the song's licensing rights and re-released the record. On 28 September 1969 (4 October 1969, week ending), the Major Minor release entered the UK chart at number three, while the Fontana release dropped out of the top 10 completely. The following week, the Major Minor release reached number-one, where it remained for one week. Combining both the Fontana and Major Minor releases, "Je t'aime... moi non plus" spent nine weeks in the UK top 10 altogether.

Multiple entries
One-hundred and fifteen singles charted in the top 10 in 1969, with one-hundred and five singles reaching their peak this year.

Thirty-one artists scored multiple entries in the top 10 in 1969. John Lennon secured the record for most top 10 hits in 1969 with four hit singles.

Amen Corner was one of a number of artists with two top-ten entries, including the number-one single "(If Paradise Is) Half as Nice". The Beach Boys, Elvis Presley, Marmalade. Simon & Garfunkel and The Temptations were among the other artists who had multiple top 10 entries in 1969.

Chart debuts
Forty-five artists achieved their first top 10 single in 1969, either as a lead or featured artist. Of these, eight went on to record another hit single that year: Bobbie Gentry, Clodagh Rodgers, Creedence Clearwater Revival, Desmond Dekker & the Aces, Glen Campbell, Jethro Tull, Peter Sarstedt and The Temptations. Marvin Gaye had two other entries in his breakthrough year.

The following table (collapsed on desktop site) does not include acts who had previously charted as part of a group and secured their first top 10 solo single.

Notes
Robin Gibb was a member of the chart-topping British group Bee Gees, who had their first top 10 entry in 1967. His number two single "Saved by the Bell" was his debut appearance in the chart as a solo artist. Cass Elliot (known professionally as Mama Cass) sang in the band The Mamas & the Papas from 1965 to 1968 until they broke up. "It's Getting Better" was her only solo recording to reach the top 10 on the UK chart.

Songs from films
Original songs from various films entered the top 10 throughout the year. These included "The Windmills of Your Mind" (from The Thomas Crown Affair) and "Time Is Tight" (UpTight).

Best-selling singles

Until 1970 there was no universally recognised year-end best-sellers list. However, in 2011 the Official Charts Company released a list of the best-selling single of each year in chart history from 1952 to date. According to the list, "Sugar, Sugar" by The Archies is officially recorded as the biggest-selling single of 1969.

Top-ten singles
Key

Entries by artist

The following table shows artists who achieved two or more top 10 entries in 1969, including singles that reached their peak in 1968 or 1970. The figures include both main artists and featured artists, while appearances on ensemble charity records are also counted for each artist. The total number of weeks an artist spent in the top ten in 1969 is also shown.

Notes

 "All I Have to Do Is Dream" reached its peak of number three on 17 January 1970 (week ending).
 "Melting Pot" reached its peak of number three on 10 January 1970 (week ending).
 "Tracy" reached its peak of number four on 10 January 1970 (week ending).
 "Dancing in the Street" originally peaked outside the top 10 at number 28 upon its initial release in 1964.
 "You've Lost That Lovin' Feelin'" originally peaked at number-one on its initial release in 1965.
 "Boom Bang-a-Bang" was the United Kingdom's winning entry (tied) at the Eurovision Song Contest in 1969.
 "The Tracks of My Tears" re-entered the top 10 at number 10 on 1 July 1969 (week ending).
 "Je t'aime... moi non plus" was originally released in the UK by Fontana Records and the Fontana release enjoyed a four-week run in the top 10 from 6 September 1969 (week ending). After Fontana deleted the single during its UK chart ascent, it was picked up by Major Minor Records, who acquired the song's licensing rights and re-released the record. The Major Minor release enjoyed a five-week run in the top 10 from 4 October 1969 (week ending) and reached number-one on 11 October 1969 (week ending). 
 "Wonderful World, Beautiful People" re-entered the top 10 at number 10 on 13 December 1969 (week ending).
 "The Liquidator" re-entered the top 10 at number 10 on 10 January 1970 (week ending).
 Figure includes single that first charted in 1968 but peaked in 1969.
 Figure includes three top 10 hits with the group The Beatles.
 Figure includes two top 10 hits with the group Bee Gees.
 Figure includes single that peaked in 1970.
 Figure includes single that peaked in 1968.

See also
1969 in British music
List of number-one singles from the 1960s (UK)

References
General

Specific

External links
1969 singles chart archive at the Official Charts Company (click on relevant week)

Top 10 singles
United Kingdom
1969